Huang Yun-wen (born 4 November 1994) is a Taiwanese taekwondo practitioner. She claimed a silver medal at the 2014 Asian Taekwondo Championships, and a gold medal at 2014 Asian Games. In both competitions, she matched up against South Korea's Yoon Jeong-yeon.

References

External links
 

Living people
1994 births
Taiwanese female taekwondo practitioners
Asian Games gold medalists for Chinese Taipei
Asian Games medalists in taekwondo
Taekwondo practitioners at the 2014 Asian Games
Medalists at the 2014 Asian Games
Universiade medalists in taekwondo
Universiade silver medalists for Chinese Taipei
World Taekwondo Championships medalists
Asian Taekwondo Championships medalists
Medalists at the 2015 Summer Universiade
21st-century Taiwanese women